Polistes fastidiosus  is a species of paper wasp from Senegal; Guinea-Bissau; Ivory Coast; Benin; Nigeria; Zaire; Sudan; Somalia; Saudi Arabia; Yemen; Kenya; Tanzania, including Zanzibar; Zambia; Mozambique; South Africa: Transvaal, Cape Prov.

References

External links
 

fastidiosus
Insects described in 1853